Tactopoda is a proposed clade of protostome animals that includes the phyla Tardigrada and Euarthropoda, supported by various morphological observations. The cladogram below shows the relationships implied by this hypothesis.

The competing hypothesis is that Arthropoda sensu lato (= Euarthropoda + Onychophora, the arthropods and the velvet worms) is monophyletic, and tardigrades lie outside this grouping.

Anatomic arguments for the tactopoda monophyly include similarities in the anatomies of head, legs, and muscles between the arthropods and the tardigrades. Anatomic arguments against it include that tardigrades lack the kind of circulatory system (including a dorsal heart) which the arthropods and the velvet worms share. Graham Budd argued that the lack of this system in recent tardigrades is due to their miniature size, which makes a complex circulatory system superfluous; thus, the loss of this feature would be a secondary property, acquired as the tardigrade stem group turned smaller, and both the Euarthropoda+Onychophora circulatory system and a relatively large size should be a feature of the last common ancestor of all three groups. However, Gregory Edgecombe also invoked phylogenomic evidence in favour of the alternative Euarthropoda+Onychophora grouping.

Etymology 
Budd formed the suggested clade name 'tactopoda' from Greek taktos, ordered, and poda, feet, "with reference to the alleged well-formed stepping motion that characterises the group".

Proposed classification

Phylum Tardigrada
Class Eutardigrada
Class Heterotardigrada
Class Mesotardigrada
Phylum Arthropoda
Class Pycnogonida (?)
Clade Arachnomorpha
Class †Trilobita
Order †Aglaspida
Order †Strabopida
Class Pycnogonida (?)
Order †Cheloniellida
Subphylum Chelicerata
Class Xiphosura
Class †Eurypterida
Class †Chasmataspidida
Class Pycnogonida (?)
Class Arachnida
Clade Mandibulata
Order †Euthycarcinoidea
Subphylum Myriapoda
Class Chilopoda
Class Symphyla
Class Diplopoda
Class Pauropoda
Clade Pancrustacea
Clade Oligostraca
Class Ostracoda
Class Ichthyostraca
Clade Altocrustacea
Clade Multicrustacea
Class Hexanauplia
Class Malacostraca
Class Thecostraca
Clade Allotriocarida
Class Branchiopoda
Clade Miracrustacea
Superclass Xenocarida
Class Cephalocarida
Class Remipedia
Subphylum Hexapoda
Paraphyletic class Entognatha
Clade Ectognatha
Class Insecta

Phylogeny

References

 
Ecdysozoa taxa
Protostome unranked clades